Gyldenstolpe is a Swedish noble family. The last male member of the family died in 1961 and the last female member in 2017.

List of people 
 Charlotte Stierneld (née Gyldenstolpe, 1766-1825), Swedish courtier
 Nils Gyldenstolpe (disambiguation), several people

See also
 Gyldenstolpe's worm skink
 

Gyldenstolpe family
Surnames of Swedish origin
Swedish noble families